Elections to Reading Borough Council took place on 6 May 2010 under the backdrop of the 2010 general election, with 15 council seats up for election. The Labour Party continued to lose seats, losing Katesgrove ward to the Liberal Democrats and Park ward to the Green Party. The Conservatives held all their seats apart from Minster ward which was a surprise gain by Labour.

The election resulted in Reading Borough Council being left in no overall control. Shortly after the election the Conservatives and Liberal Democrats announced they would form a coalition to govern locally, ending over two decades of Labour control.

Election result

Ward results

References
Reading Borough Council Local Elections 2010

2010 English local elections
May 2010 events in the United Kingdom
2010
2010s in Berkshire